S M Moniruzzaman OSP, ndc, ncc, psc is a two star Admiral of Bangladesh Navy and the incumbent Bangladesh Navy Fleet (COMBAN). Prior joining here, he had been serving as the managing director of Bangladesh Shipping Corporation.

Early life and education 
Moniruzzaman had completed his higher secondary certificate from Cumilla Cadet College. Later he joined Bangladesh Navy as officer cadet in 1988. After two years of military training he got commissioned in the Executive Branch on 1990.

Military career 
Moniruzzaman served as Chief Staff Officer to Commander Chattogram Naval Area from 2017 to 2018. After that, he served as pioneer Commander Flotilla West until January 2020. Then he joined as the managing director of Dockyard & Engineering Works Ltd. On 2022, he appointed as managing director of BSC and serve there until he elevated to Rear Admiral in January 2023.

References 

Living people
Bangladesh Navy personnel
Bangladeshi Navy admirals